The Mersin Volleyball Hall is an indoor sports hall for volleyball events at Yenişehir district of Mersin, Turkey.

The venue was constructed for the 2013 Mediterranean Games within 248 working days. Seating capacity of the sports hall is 1,000. It went in service on June 10, 2013 during two friendship matches played between the local men's and women's volleyball teams.

The sports hall hosted the men's volleyball tournament events of the 2013 Mediterranean Games from June 21 to 27 while the final matches were played at the much bigger Servet Tazegül Arena.

References

Indoor arenas in Turkey
Volleyball venues in Turkey
Sports venues in Mersin
Sports venues completed in 2013
2013 Mediterranean Games venues
Yenişehir, Mersin